Pizza My Heart is a 2005 film directed by Andy Wolk and starring Shiri Appleby, Michael Badalucco, and Eyal Podell.  The movie premiered July 24, 2005, on ABC Family.   It tells the story of a son and daughter of two rival pizzeria owners who fall in love, much to the disapproval of both families. It is a modern retelling of Romeo and Juliet set in modern-day Verona, New Jersey.

Cast (in alphabetical order)

The Prestolanis
 Shiri Appleby as Gina Prestolani 
 Michael Badalucco as Lou Prestolani
 Joanna Canton as Annette Prestolani
 Ann Mahoney as Prestolani Cousin 
 Natalia Nogulich as Mary Prestolani

The Montebellos
 Eyal Podell as Joe Montebello 
Rob Boltin as Nicky Montebello
 Gina Hecht as Gloria Montebello 
 Dan Hedaya as Vinnie Montebello

The others
 Gary Desroche as Customer 
 Matthew Dufour as Festival Patron 
 Wayne Ferrara as Uncle Nat 
 Larry Gamell Jr. as Firefighter 
 Anthony Gangi as Fair Patron/Romantic Couple 
 Vanessa Guild as Customer #1 
 Bryan James Kitto as Antonio 
 Cynthia LeBlanc as Fair goer 
 Elton LeBlanc as Church Usher 
 Don Lincoln as Carnival Vendor 
 John Mese as Jean Paul Veber 
 Gerald Moorman as Prestolani Delivery Boy 
 Derek Morgan as Rouzan 
 Wayne Morgan as Church Member 
 Sean Olsen 
 William Ragsdale as Tommy 
 Dane Rhodes as Blue-Collar Neighbor 
 Mathilde Semmes as Festival Patron 
 Brian Simonson 
 Maria Soccor as Barker 
 Nick Spano as Carlo Delrio 
 Deneen Tyler as Sous Chef 
 T.J. Villarrubia Jr. as Churchgoer
 Alec Rayme as Vinnie the cousin

Filming locations
 New Orleans, Louisiana, United States
 Hammond, Louisiana, United States 
 Yonkers, New York, United States

References

External links 
 

Films based on Romeo and Juliet
Modern adaptations of works by William Shakespeare
ABC Family original films
2000s English-language films
2005 television films
2005 films
Films shot in Louisiana
Films shot in New York (state)
Films set in New Jersey
Films directed by Andy Wolk